Back to Mine: Adam Freeland, compiled by DJ Adam Freeland is the twenty-first compilation album in the Back to Mine series published by the Dance Music Collective.

The compilation album received coverage in NME; the review's conclusion was "Damn near perfect - 8/10."

Freeland shared his thoughts on the album compilation process:

Track listing 

 Adam Freeland – Intro
 ...And You Will Know Us by the Trail of Dead – Will You Smile Again for Me
 Autolux – Turnstile Blues
 Interpol – Untitled
 TV on the Radio – Staring at the Sun
 Ambulance LTD – Yoga Means Union
 The Beta Band – It's Not Too Beautiful
 Jape – Floating
 EL-P – Constellation Recall
 Elliott Smith – Needle in the Hay
 PJ Harvey – The Slow Drug
 Funkadelic – Maggot Brain
 Dyke House – Sandy Strip
 M83 – Lower Your Eyes to Die With the Sun
 Trans Am – A Single Ray of Light on an Other Wise Cloudy Day
 Boards of Canada – Zoetrope

References

External links 
 Review by 365Mag
 
 Amazon
 [ Allmusic]

Adam Freeland albums
Freeland, Adam
2005 compilation albums